The Constable is a 2013 Hong Kong action drama film written, produced and directed by Dennis Law and starring Simon Yam.

Plot
Lam Kwok-kuen is a police officer who served for many years in the police force and has many admirable achievements. He now taking care of his mental son, Chung.

At night, a drunken pretty girl walking on the street. A group of thugs attempt to rob and rape the girl, Lam appears and defeats all of the thugs, rescue the girl.

Lam hires a girl named Lin Tsui-yan to watch Chung when he goes to work. This made Tsui-yan's boyfriend, Chow Gong-hong feel uncomfortable. But after a while, Chung suffered a heart attack and died in his sleep. After Chung's death, Tsui-yan still spent a lot of time at Lam's house. Gong-hong begins to get angry and suspects that Tsui-yan having an affair with Lam. Tsui-yan wants to break up with Gong-hong and return to her hometown.

Gong-hong owed money to a gangster named Dah Kin, and Dah Kin asked Gong-hong to go with him if Gong-hong wants to have money to repay. Dah Kin and his gang have a plot to rob the bank. After his son's death, Lam asked to be transfer from the transport team to the criminal team.

During the patrol, Lam saw Gong-hong and Dah Kin's gang, who were about to rob the bank. When Lam demand the gang get out of their car, the gang fire their guns at Lam. Lam called for more police to support him. After a car chase on the street, the gang enter an abandoned warehouse. Lam chased after Gong-hong, while the other police officers surrounded the gang. After a gunfight, the police force arrested Dah Kin and his gang. Gong-hong falls from the high to the ground and is severely injured. He was also arrested by the police.

Lam returned to his police station and received a letter from Tsui-yan. Tsui-yan revealed now she is in her hometown and teaching dance to the children.

Cast
Simon Yam as Lam Kwok-kuen, a police officer whose sole requirement on the job is oversee the department fleet. Despite this, he remains active in the front line of police service, putting his life on the line for sake of others, his heroism bettering even the most seasoned professionals.
Lam Suet as Lok Wah-wai, nicknamed Fat Wai, good friend and colleague of Lam for years. Despite his weight, he is the renowned marksman of the police force.
Niu Mengmeng as Lin Tsui-yan, who is employed by Lam to look after his mentally challenged son, Chung. Yan lovingly cared for Chung, but this led to the misunderstanding of his boyfriend, Chow, that she has been two timing with Lam. Yan later left Chow for her hometown after Chung died.
Sam Lee as Chow Gong-hong, a small-time crook living with his uncle in Shenzhen who mistakenly accused his girlfriend, Tsui-yan, for having an affair with Lam. He is later arrested in Hong Kong due his involvement in an armed bank robbery.
Maggie Shiu as Station Sergeant Hui Chun, an outstanding police officer and good friend of Lam.
Wang Ziyi as Lui Kiu-mei, nicknamed Sissy, Lam's subordinate in the Force fleet department. A secret admirer of WPC Fa-fa, the self abased Lui never dared to express his feelings for her. However, inspired and encouraged by Lam, Lui vowed to work hard to improve himself to win Fa's love and pursue his dream to be a Flying Tiger.
Maggie Li as Fa-fa, a WPC under Hui and the object of Lui's affection. She was unimpressed initially by Lui until she witnessed his daring feat during a police gun fight.
Ken Lo as Dah Kin
Li Jinjiang as Lam Wing-chung, nicknamed Little Chung, Lam's down syndrome son. He is well cared and loved by his father despite Chung's health condition. Since birth, Chung has lived a happy life.
Mia Chen as Drunken pretty girl
Wang Siya as Ginny
Lisa Cheng as Lady Gangster
Lo Hoi-pang as Uncle On (guest star)
Cheung Siu-fai as Wong Ha (guest star)

References

External links
Official Website

The Constable at HongKong Cinemagic

2013 films
2010s Cantonese-language films
Hong Kong action drama films
Hong Kong martial arts films
Films directed by Dennis Law
Gun fu films
Police detective films
2013 action drama films
Films set in Shenzhen
Films set in Hong Kong
Films shot in Hong Kong
Films set in the 2010s
Films set in 2012
2013 martial arts films
2010s police films
2010s Hong Kong films